Reunion 2: The Bachelor Party is a 2016 Finnish comedy film directed by Taneli Mustonen. It is sequel to the 2015 film Reunion. This time three friends, Antti, Niklas and Tuomas, end up in a new catastrophic  adventure as Niklas and Antti try to arrange for Tuomas an all-time bachelor party while they are due to go to the funeral of their old classmate. Like the previous film, the sequel is starring by Sami Hedberg, Aku Hirviniemi and Jaajo Linnonmaa.

The Bachelor Party is based on the Danish film Klassefesten 2. Its script follows mostly the same plot, but it has been adapted to suit Finnish characters in the world of film. The pre-production of the film and the post-production of Mustonen's previous film Bodom were made at the same time in 2016. The film was shot in April-May 2016, and the shooting took place in Hämeenlinna and Helsinki, among others. Like its predecessor, the film did not receive praise from critics and, in addition, attracted fewer viewers than its predecessor. Jaajo Linnonmaa believes that the reason for this was that they knew how to "play a little" and tried to bring emotion to their story.

In 2021, the film received a sequel, Reunion 3: Singles Cruise, and was directed by Renny Harlin instead of Mustonen.

Cast 
 Sami Hedberg as Antti
 Aku Hirviniemi as Niklas
 Jaajo Linnonmaa as Tuomas
 Kalle Lamberg as Henrik
 Anu Sinisalo as Karola
 Niina Lahtinen as Jaana
 Manuela Bosco as Malena
 Eeva Litmanen as Birgit
 Helena Vierikko as Leila
 Saija Lentonen as librarian
 Mika Suutari as gang leader

References

External links 

Luokkakokous 2 – Polttarit at Solar Films (in Finnish)

2016 comedy films
2016 films
Finnish comedy films
Films directed by Taneli Mustonen
Finnish sequel films